The Rural Municipality of Montrose No. 315 is a rural municipality (RM) in the Canadian province of Saskatchewan within Census Division No. 12 and  Division No. 5.

History 
The RM of Montrose No. 315 incorporated as a rural municipality on December 13, 1909.

Geography

Communities and localities 
The following unincorporated communities are within the RM.

Localities
 Donavon
 Gledhow
 Laura (dissolved as a village, December 31, 1954, again December 28, 1978)
 Swanson
 Valley Park

Demographics 

Government 
The RM of Montrose No. 315 is governed by an elected municipal council and an appointed administrator that meets on the second Thursday of every month. The reeve of the RM is Murray Purcell while its administrator is Desiree Bouvier. The RM's office is located in Delisle.

Transportation 
 Saskatchewan Highway 7
 Saskatchewan Highway 45
 Saskatchewan Highway 766
 Canadian National Railway Company
 Big Sky Railway Corporation

See also 
List of rural municipalities in Saskatchewan

References 

M